The EMD SD38-2 is a model of six-axle diesel-electric locomotive built by General Motors Electro-Motive Division (EMD) from 1972 to 1979. EMD built 90 of these medium road-switchers, which were used in both yard and mainline roles. Part of the EMD Dash 2 line, the SD38-2 was an upgraded SD38 with modular electronic control systems, HT-C trucks, and many other detail improvements. The locomotive's power was provided by an EMD 16-645E 16-cylinder engine, which could generate . These units were constructed with either  fuel tanks and were available with or without dynamic brakes.

Original owners

See also 
List of GM-EMD locomotives
List of GMD Locomotives

References 
 
 GATX Rail Locomotive Group. SD38-2 specification page. Retrieved on June 23, 2005.
 Sarberenyi, Robert. EMD SD38-2 Original Owners
EMD SD38-2 general arrangement drawing (Spec. 8086 07/75) and clearance diagram (04/72), Robb Fisher, RFDI.

External links

 Sarberenyi, Robert. EMD SD38-2 Original Owners

SD38-2
SD38-2
C-C locomotives
Diesel-electric locomotives of the United States
Railway locomotives introduced in 1972
Freight locomotives
Standard gauge locomotives of the United States
5 ft 3 in gauge locomotives